The Campeonato Argentino de Rugby 1958 was won by the selection of Capital that defeated the selection of Buenos Aires Province ("Provincia"). There were fourteen teams that participated, including two new selections: Valle de Lerma (Salta Province) and Sur.

Rugby Union in Argentina in 1958
 The Buenos Aires Champsionship was won by Buenos Aires CRC
 The Cordoba Province Championship was won by Universitario and Jockey Club
 The North-East Championship was won by Universitario Tucumán
 Argentina won the 1958 South American Rugby Championship

Knock out stages

Final 

 Capital R. Raimundez ('B. A.), C. Lennon (Belgrano), E. Karplus (Pueyrredón), E. Fernández del Casal (C.U.B.A.), J. Ferrer (C.U.B.A.), L. Méndez (O. S.), R. Brown (B. A.), S. Hogg (B. A.), M. Aspiroz (B. A.), C. Álvarez (C.U.B.A.), D. R. Hogg (B.. A.), J. Trebotich (Puey¬rredón), E. Gaviña (C.U.B.A.), C. Ezcurra (C.U.B.A.), E. Verardo (Belgrano).
 Provincia: R. Pesce (A. D. F.), O. Bernacchi (Curupaytí), J. Campos S. Fernando), J. L. Guidi (A. D. F.), A. Salinas (Olivos), I. Comas (Pucará), E. Holmgreen (Olivos), J. Vibart (O. Phil.), S. Gamarra S. Fernando), J. Pulido (A. D. F.), E. Parola (Curupaytí), A. Otaño (Pucará), E. Sorhaburu (Olivos), R. Santángelo (Curupaytí), O. Diserio (S. Fernando).

External links
 Memorias de la UAR 1958
 Memorias de la UAR 1958

Campeonato Argentino de Rugby
Argentina
Campeonato